The 2009 Women's EuroHockey Nations Trophy was the third edition of the Women's EuroHockey Nations Trophy, the second level of the women's European field hockey championships organized by the European Hockey Federation. It was held from 19 to 25 July 2009 in Rome, Italy.

Belgium won its first EuroHockey Nations Trophy title and were promoted to the 2011 EuroHockey Championship together with the hosts Italy.

Qualified teams

Results

Preliminary round

Pool A

Pool B

Fifth to eighth place classification

Pool C
The points obtained in the preliminary round against the other team are taken over.

First to fourth place classification

Semi-finals

Third place game

Final

Final standings

See also
2009 Men's EuroHockey Nations Trophy
2009 Women's EuroHockey Nations Championship

References

Women's EuroHockey Championship II
EuroHockey Nations Trophy
Women 2
EuroHockey Nations Trophy
EuroHockey Nations Trophy Men
International women's field hockey competitions hosted by Italy
Sports competitions in Rome
2000s in Rome